Valeriya Salamatina (born 19 September 1998) is a Russian swimmer.

She competed in the 2018 European Aquatics Championships, winning silver medal in both the 4×200m women's freestyle relay and the 4×200m mixed freestyle relay.

References

1998 births
Living people
Russian female swimmers
Russian female freestyle swimmers
European Aquatics Championships medalists in swimming
Universiade medalists in swimming
Universiade gold medalists for Russia
Medalists at the 2017 Summer Universiade
Swimmers at the 2020 Summer Olympics